Model-driven (or model driven) is used mainly in software design and may refer to:

 Model-driven architecture
 Model-driven engineering (MDE)
 Model-driven integration
 Model Driven Interoperability (MDI)
 Model-driven security (MDS)
 Model-driven software development (MDSD)
 Model-driven testing
 Model-driven application

See also
 Surrogate model
 Space mapping